Øverbygd Church is a parish church of the Church of Norway in Målselv Municipality in Troms og Finnmark county, Norway. It is the main church for the Øverbygd parish which is part of the Senja prosti (deanery) in the Diocese of Nord-Hålogaland. The white, wooden church was built in a long church style in 1867 by the architect Jacob Wilhelm Nordan. The church seats about 280 people. The church was consecrated by Bishop Carl Peter Parelius Essendrop.

See also
List of churches in Nord-Hålogaland

References

Målselv
Churches in Troms
Wooden churches in Norway
19th-century Church of Norway church buildings
Churches completed in 1867
1867 establishments in Norway
Long churches in Norway